Aliabad is a village and municipality in the Bilasuvar District of Azerbaijan. It has a population of 1,156.

References 

Populated places in Bilasuvar District